Barrage Gouin Water Aerodrome  is located on the St-Maurice River, Quebec, Canada. It is open from mid-May to mid-November.

References

Registered aerodromes in Mauricie
Seaplane bases in Quebec